Our Subway Baby is a picture book written by Peter Mercurio, illustrated by Leo Espinosa, and published September 15, 2020 by Dial Press. The book tells the true story of how Pete and his husband, Danny, found and eventually adopted their son, Kevin.

Background 
Based on a true story, Our Subway Baby illustrates how author Peter Mercurio and his husband Danny Stewart saved an infant child in New York City’s Union Square Subway station. At the station, Danny Stewart momentarily glanced at the floor and saw what he initially believed was a baby doll wrapped in a sweatshirt. However, he soon realized the baby was a living infant and promptly called 911. The discovery occurred in August of 2000 and the baby was later adopted in December of 2002.

Style 
The book contains digital mixed media art illustrations throughout, and includes more recent pictures of the author, his partner, and their son.

Reception 
Our Subway Baby received positive reviews from Kirkus, who called the book "[a] delightful story of love and hope," School Library Journal, and the American Library Association (ALA). 

The book is a Junior Library Guild selection and received the following accolades:

 American Library Association's Rainbow List top ten (2021)
 Lambda Literary Award for Children's and Young Adult Literature finalist (2021)
 ALA Reference and User Services Association (RUSA) included Our Subway Baby in their top-25 list of books. 
 September's Most Anticipated LGBTQ Books from the Lambda Literary Review (2020)

References 

2020 children's books
2020s LGBT literature
American picture books
Children's books with LGBT themes
Dial Press books